The 18413 / 14 Intercity Express is an Express  train belonging to Indian Railways East Coast Railway zone that runs between  and  in India.

Coaches
The 18413 / 14 Intercity Express has six general unreserved & two SLR (seating with luggage rake) coaches . It does not carry a pantry car coach.

As is customary with most train services in India, coach composition may be amended at the discretion of Indian Railways depending on demand.

Service

Routing

Traction
As the route is electrified, a  based WAM-4 electric locomotive pulls the train to its destination.

References

External links
18413 Intercity Express at India Rail Info
18414 Intercity Express at India Rail Info

Intercity Express (Indian Railways) trains
Transport in Paradeep
Rail transport in Odisha
Transport in Puri